Craig Daniel Hepburn (born 10 December 1969) is a retired male long jumper from the Bahamas, best known for finishing 13th at the 1992 Olympic Games. His personal best is 8.41 metres, achieved in June 1993 in Nassau. This is the national record.

Achievements

References

sports-reference

1969 births
Living people
Bahamian male long jumpers
Bahamian male hurdlers
Athletes (track and field) at the 1991 Pan American Games
Athletes (track and field) at the 1992 Summer Olympics
Athletes (track and field) at the 1994 Commonwealth Games
Olympic athletes of the Bahamas
Commonwealth Games competitors for the Bahamas
Pan American Games competitors for the Bahamas